The Blythe Hill Tavern is a grade II listed public house in Forest Hill, south London.

References

External links 

Blythe Hill Tavern

Grade II listed pubs in London
Grade II listed buildings in the London Borough of Lewisham